Villafranca Piemonte is a comune (municipality) in the Metropolitan City of Turin in the Italian region Piedmont, located about 35 km southwest of Turin.

Villafranca Piemonte borders the following municipalities: Vigone, Pancalieri, Cavour, Faule, Moretta, Barge, and Cardè.

Economy
Villafranca's economy was traditionally based on fishing; today the main activities are agriculture and animal husbandry.

Twin towns
 Belhomert-Guéhouville, France
  El Trébol, Argentina
 Saint-Maurice-Saint-Germain, France

References